Diclybothrium is a genus of monogeneans in the family Diclybothriidae. It consists of one species, Diclybothrium armatum Leuckart, 1835.

References

Polyopisthocotylea
Monogenea genera
Monotypic protostome genera